This article lists the episodes from the anime series Sayonara, Zetsubou-Sensei animated by Shaft and directed by Akiyuki Shinbo. It premiered in Japan on July 7, 2007 on TV Kanagawa and contained twelve episodes. There was also a preface and a "girls collection" bonus OVA.

A Zetsubou Girls Collection DVD was released on January 1, 2008. The DVD consists of seven parts, each featuring one of main heroines with several additions to the original TV broadcast version. A 20-minute summary (preface) was aired on BS11 Digital on January 4, 2008. The second season, Zoku, began airing on January 5, 2008. A set of three Goku OVAs were released, starting with the first volume on October 17, 2008 and the third in early 2009. The Zan season began in mid-2009 and concluded after 13 episodes and two bonus OVAs, the last of which came out in 2010. A special was released in January 2012. Though not part of any season, it still uses the same opening and ending themes as Zan. Each episode title is a reference to a piece of literature. Each episode ends with a still image drawn by one of manga artists associated with Kōji Kumeta.

Sayonara, Zetsubou-Sensei
The series was directed by Akiyuki Shinbo at studio Shaft, with Kenichi Kanemaki as the series composition writer and Naoyuki Tatsuwa as the assistant director, and Tomoki Hasegawa composing the series' music. Hideyuki Morioka designed the characters for animation; and Morioka, Hiroki Yamamura (Studio Pastoral), and Yoshiaki Itou (Shaft) served as the chief animation directors. Half of the season was outsourced to Studio Pastoral: episodes 2, 4–5, 7, 9, and 11.

Opening Themes
 - Kenji Ohtsuki feat. Ai Nonaka, Marina Inoue, Yū Kobayashi, Miyuki Sawashiro & Ryoko Shintani (eps 1-9, 12)
 - Ai Nonaka, Marina Inoue, Yū Kobayashi & Ryoko Shintani (eps 10-11)

Ending Theme
 - Ai Nonaka, Marina Inoue, Yū Kobayashi & Ryoko Shintani

(Zoku) Sayonara Zetsubō Sensei
The series features a majority of the returning staff as the first season with a few changes. Akiyuki Shinbo, Naoyuki Tatsuwa, and Hideyuki Morioka returned as director, assistant director, and character designer (respectively); and Morioka and Hiroki Yamamura (Studio Pastoral) acted as chief animation directors (but without Yoshiaki Itou from the first season). Yukihiro Miyamoto joined the production as chief unit director, Kenichi Kanemaki was replaced as series composition writer by Yuuichirou Oguro, and Shaft (under the collective penname of Fuyashi Tou) took credit for the composition itself. Episodes 2, 4, 6, 8, and 12 were outsourced to Studio Pastoral; and segments, or the whole of, episodes 3, 5, 7, 9, 11, and 13 were outsourced to Gainax.

Opening Themes
 - Kenji Ohtsuki and Zetsubō Shōjo-tachi
 - Ai Nonaka, Marina Inoue and Ryōko Shintani (ep 7)

Ending Themes
 - Zetsubō Shōjo-tachi (eps 1-4)
 - Rolly and Zetsubō Shōjo-tachi (eps 5-12)
 - Ai Nonaka, Marina Inoue, Yū Kobayashi and Ryoko Shintani (ep 13)

Goku Sayonara Zetsubō Sensei
The OVA retains much of the same staff from Zoku with few changes. Akiyuki Shinbo, Naoyuki Tatsuwa, Yukihiro Miyamoto, Hideyuki Morioka, and Hiroki Yamamura all retain their previous roles as director, assistant director, chief unit director, character designer/chief animation director, and chief animation director, respectively. However, Oguro is replaced as series composition writer by Shinbo and Shaft (the latter under the collective penname of Fuyashi Tou) themselves.

Opening Themes
 - Kenji Ohtsuki and Zetsubō Shōjo-tachi (vol 1-2)
 - Kenji Ohtsuki and Zetsubō Shōjo-tachi feat. Rapbit (vol 3)

Ending Themes
 - Rolly and Zetsubō Shōjo-tachi (vol 1)
 - Ai Nonaka, Marina Inoue, Yū Kobayashi and Ryoko Shintani (vol 2-3)

Zan Sayonara Zetsubō Sensei

Opening Theme
 - Kenji Ohtsuki and Zetsubō Shōjo-tachi

Ending Themes
 - Zetsubō Shōjo-tachi (episodes 1–9, 13)
 - Hiroshi Kamiya (episodes 10–12)

Zan Sayonara Zetsubō Sensei Bangaichi
All of the main staff from Goku remain the same for Zan, including director/series composition writer Akiyuki Shinbo, studio/series composition writer Shaft, assistant director Naoyuki Tatsuwa, chief unit director Yukihiro Miyamoto, character designer/chief animation director Hideyuki Morioka, and chief animation director Hiroki Yamamura (Studio Pastoral). Several parts or the wholes of different episodes were outsourced to other studios: episodes 2-3 and 11 to Studio Pastoral; episodes 4, 9, and 12 to Mushi Production; episode 5 to Mito Animation; and episodes 6, 10, and 13 to Studio Izena.

Opening Theme
 - Kenji Ohtsuki and Zetsubō Shōjo-tachi

Ending Themes
 - Zetsubō Shōjo-tachi (episode 1)
 - Hiroshi Kamiya (episode 2)

Notes and references

External links
 
 
 
 
 

Sayonara Zetsubou-Sensei
Kōji Kumeta